The 2004–05 season was Olympiacos's 46th consecutive season in the Alpha Ethniki and their 79th year in existence. The club were played their 8th consecutive season in the UEFA Champions League. In the beginning of the summertime Olympiacos named Norwegian Trond Sollied coach.

Squad

Competitions

Alpha Ethniki

League standings

Results summary

Results by round

Results
Dates not displayed

Olympiacos 1-1 AEK
Olympiakos 3-0 Halkidona
Olympiacos 2-0 Apollon Kalamarias
Olympiacos 2-1 Aris
Olympiacos 3-1 Egaleo
Olympiacos 2-0 Ergotelis
Olympiacos 2-1 Ionikos
Olympiacos 1-0 Iraklis
Olympiacos 2-1 Kallithea
Olympiacos 3-0 Kerkyra
Olympiacos 3-0 OFI Crete
Olympiacos 1-0 Panathinaikos
Olympiacos 3-0 Panionios
Olympiacos 5-1 PAOK
Olympiacos 0-0 Skoda Xanthi
AEK 0-0 Olympiacos
Apollon Kalamarias 0-2 Olympiacos
Aris 0-1 Olympiacos
Egaleo 2-2 Olympiacos
Ergotelis 2-1 Olympiacos
Halkidona 1-1 Olympiacos
Ionikos 0-4 Olympiacos
Iraklis 0-1 Olympiacos
Kallithea 1-1 Olympiacos
Kerkyra 1-3 Olympiacos
OFI 1-1 Olympiacos
Panathinaikos 1-0 Olympiacos
Panionios 0-2 Olympiacos
PAOK 1-1 Olympiacos
Skoda Xanthi 2-1 Olympiacos

UEFA Champions League

Group stage

All times at CET

UEFA Cup 

All times at CET

Knockout stage

Round of 32

Round of 16

Team kit

|

|

Notes

References

External links 
 Official Website of Olympiacos Piraeus 

2004-05
Greek football clubs 2004–05 season
2004–05